Colette Sénami Agossou Houeto (born 1939 in Porto-Novo) is a Beninese educator, feminist poet and politician. She was Minister of Primary and Secondary Education in Boni Yayi's first government.

Life
Colette Houeto was born in 1939 in Porto-Novo in Ouémé Department. She attended local primary schools before going to secondary school in Cotonou. She attended the University of Strasbourg and later the Ludwig Maximilian University of Munich. In Benin she served as Director of the National Institute of Training and Research into Education from 1977 to 1981. She also wrote a volume of poetry, published in 1981. From 1986 to 1991, she worked with the African Development Bank, aiming to integrate women into Benin's development program.

Colette Houeto has been active in Adrien Houngbédji's Democratic Renewal Party.

Works
 'La femme, source de vie dans l'Afrique traditionnelle', in La Civilisation de la femme dans la tradition africaine, Paris: Présence africaine, 1975
 'Education et mass-media', Présence Africaine, No. 95 (1975), pp.428-40
 L'aube sur les cactus. Porto-Novo, Bénin, 1981. Preface by Jean Pliya. Illustrated by Jean-Claude Lespingal.
 'Women and Education: the Case of Benin', EDUAFRICA, Vol. 8 (1982), pp.169-179

References

Beninese women poets
Beninese educators
People from Porto-Novo
University of Strasbourg alumni
Ludwig Maximilian University of Munich alumni
1939 births
Living people
20th-century poets
20th-century women writers
Women government ministers of Benin
20th-century Beninese women politicians
20th-century Beninese politicians